The River Oaks International Tennis Tournament, also known as the River Oaks Invitational Tennis Tournament, was a men's tennis tournament held in early spring from 1931 until 2007 at the River Oaks Country Club, Houston, Texas, USA. The tournament was the oldest in the country to still be played at its original site, in the original stadium. The tournament was founded by cotton broker Jack Norton. From the very beginning, the River Oaks International was an invitational amateur tournament, and was not associated with the professional tennis associations. From the start, the field was filled with a few stars and then local candidates filled out the rest of the field. The inaugural edition in April 1931, which made a loss of $1,500, was won by 19-year-old Ellsworth Vines. The tournament was not held during the World War II years 1942–1945.

In 1971 the tournament was part of the Grand Prix tennis circuit while from 1973 until 1977 it formed part of the World Championship Tennis circuit. One of the landmark tournament events was in 1974, the championship match was broadcast before a national audience; thirty-four-year-old Rod Laver, met heir apparent, seventeen-year-old Björn Borg. Laver, who in 1961 became the first foreign player to win the singles title, won in straight sets and became the first man to hold four singles championships at River Oaks.

In 2008, the River Oaks International was merged with one of the oldest, and last remaining clay court tournaments in the United States, the U.S. Men's Clay Court Championships.

Finals

Singles

See also

 U.S. Men's Clay Court Championships

References

External links
ATP – Tournament Profile

Clay court tennis tournaments
Exhibition tennis tournaments
Recurring sporting events established in 1931
Defunct tennis tournaments in the United States
Tennis tournaments in Texas